Burlington Township may refer to:

 Burlington Township, Kane County, Illinois
 Burlington Township, Carroll County, Indiana
 Burlington Township, Calhoun County, Michigan
 Burlington Township, Lapeer County, Michigan
 Burlington Township, Minnesota
 Burlington Township, New Jersey
 Burlington Township, Ward County, North Dakota, in Ward County, North Dakota
 Burlington Township, Licking County, Ohio
 Burlington Township, Bradford County, Pennsylvania

See also

 Burlington Township High School, in New Jersey

Township name disambiguation pages